John Costigan (born 1945) is an Irish retired hurler who played as a right corner-back for the Tipperary senior team.

Costigan joined the team during the 1968 championship and was a semi-regular member of the team until he retired from inter-county hurling after the 1972 championship. During that time he won one Munster winners' medal and one National Hurling League winners' medal. He ended up as an All-Ireland runner-up on one occasion.

At club level Costigan played with the Clonakenny club.

In retirement from play he served as a Gaelic games administrator, most notably as chairman of the Tipperary County Board.

Costigan went to Maynooth College in 1963 as a clerical student, leaving in 1966 after completing his degree.

References

 

1945 births
Living people
Clonakenny hurlers
Tipperary inter-county hurlers
Munster inter-provincial hurlers
Alumni of St Patrick's College, Maynooth